Location Africa is a 1987 documentary film by Swiss filmmaker Steff Gruber.

Overview
During the work of filming Fetish & Dreams Steff Gruber was introduced by his cameraman Rainer Klausmann to the German film director Werner Herzog. In 1987 the latter invited him to follow the filming work as his film Cobra Verde was created in Ghana.
Location Africa documents the filming work and last cooperative project of Werner Herzog and Klaus Kinski.

Festivals 
 Solothurn Film Festival 1988
 International Istanbul Film Festival 1988
 International Film Festival „Alpinale" Bludenz 1988

References

External links
 Location Africa at the Internet Movie Database

Swiss documentary films
Films directed by Steff Gruber
1987 films
Swiss independent films
Documentary films about films
Films set in Ghana
Werner Herzog